Grand Portage National Monument, on the north shore of Lake Superior in northeastern Minnesota, preserves a vital center of fur trade activity and Anishinaabeg Ojibwe heritage.

Grand Portage may also refer to:

 Grand Portage (community), Minnesota
 Grand Portage, Minnesota
 Grand Portage River (disambiguation)

See also